Xin Xin is a female giant panda that lives in the Chapultepec Zoo in Mexico City. Xin Xin (新新 "new" in Chinese) was conceived via artificial insemination and was born in the Zoo on 1 July 1990. Her mother is Tohui (she died 16 November 1993) and her father is Chia Chia from the London Zoo (died in Mexico on 13 October 1991).
Xin Xin is one of only three giant pandas in the Americas outside the United States. She is the youngest of the Mexican pandas. Xin Xin can be visited for free during normal Zoo hours.

Xin Xin is artificially inseminated annually with sperm from Chinese panda Ling-Ling as part of a continuing effort to breed pandas in Mexico. Mexico's Chapultepec Zoo has had one of the most successful panda-breeding programs outside of China, with a total of eight giant pandas conceived in the zoo since the first pandas arrived in Mexico in 1975. This has been attributed by some to the Zoo's 7300 ft.  altitude, similar to the pandas' native habitat in Sichuan, China.

Chinese Xin Xin
Xin Xin is also the name of a panda which was born in China on 6 August 2005.

References

Individual giant pandas
1990 animal births